Khar Nuur (black lake)  may refer to either of two lakes in Mongolia:
 Khar Lake (Zavkhan) (Har Nuur)
 Khar Lake (Khovd)